Pseudoxanthomonas broegbernensis is a yellow-pigmented bacteria the type species of its genus. Its type strain is B1616/1T (= DSM 12573T).

References

Further reading
Whitman, William B., et al., eds. Bergey's manual® of systematic bacteriology. Vol. 2. Springer, 2012.

External links

LPSN
Type strain of Pseudoxanthomonas broegbernensis at BacDive -  the Bacterial Diversity Metadatabase

Xanthomonadales
Gram-negative bacteria
Bacteria described in 2000